D. J. Sharabi (born March 7, 1992) is an American-Israeli professional baseball pitcher for the Sioux Falls Canaries of the American Association of Professional Baseball. He pitched 4.1 scoreless innings for Team Israel at the 2020 Summer Olympics in Tokyo in the summer of 2021.

Career
Sharabi graduated from Burlingame High School in Burlingame, California, in 2010. He pitched for the school's baseball team through his senior year, despite having a torn ligament in his throwing elbow. He enrolled at College of San Mateo and had the ligament surgically repaired. He transferred to San Jose State University to continue his college baseball career with the San Jose State Spartans.

Great Bend Boom
Sharabi made his professional debut on May 19, 2016 with the Great Bend Boom of the Pecos League. Sharabi posted a 5-3 record and 4.60 ERA in 10 appearances for the Boom.

Sonoma Stompers
In 2017, Sharabi joined the Sonoma Stompers of the Pacific Association, and tossed 39.1 innings of 2.29 ERA ball in 29 games for the team. In 2018, Sharabi worked to a 2.45 ERA with 51 strikeouts in 47.2 innings of work across 36 games, and placed 5th in Reliever of the Year voting. In 2019, Sharabi appeared in 5 games for Sonoma, posting a 1.50 ERA with 10 strikeouts.

Cleburne Railroaders
On June 11, 2019, Sharabi's contract was purchased by the Cleburne Railroaders of the American Association of Professional Baseball. Sharabi finished out the year with a 4.17 ERA in 30 appearances for Cleburne. On February 18, 2020, Sharabi was released by the Railroaders.

Sioux Falls Canaries
On June 25, 2020, Sharabi signed with the Sioux Falls Canaries of the American Association of Professional Baseball. Sharabi appeared in 28 games for Sioux Falls in 2020, pitching to a 4.80 ERA with 32 strikeouts in 30.0 innings of work.

Sharabi began the 2021 season with the Canaries before joining the Israeli baseball team in the Olympics. Sharabi returned to the team following the Olympics and ended the year with a 3.48 ERA in 21 appearances, with 27 strikeouts in 20.2 innings..

Ibaraki Astro Planets
On May 13, 2022, Sharabi signed with the Ibaraki Astro Planets of the Japanese independent Baseball Challenge League.

Milwaukee Milkmen
On July 14, 2022, Sharabi signed with the Milwaukee Milkmen of the American Association of Professional Baseball. He pitched in 10 games for Milwaukee, struggling to an 0-1 record and 6.00 ERA with 5 strikeouts in 9.0 innings pitched.

Sioux Falls Canaries (second stint)
On February 23, 2023, Sharabi was claimed off waivers by the Sioux Falls Canaries.

Team Israel

Sharabi pitched 4.1 scoreless innings over three games for Team Israel at the 2020 Summer Olympics in Tokyo in the summer of 2021. He held opposing batters to a batting average of .133.

References

External links

Baseball/Softball SHARABI DJ - Tokyo 2020 Olympics

Living people
1992 births
Baseball players at the 2020 Summer Olympics
Olympic baseball players of Israel
San Jose State Spartans baseball players
Sonoma Stompers players
Cleburne Railroaders players
Sioux Falls Canaries players
Milwaukee Milkmen players